Cyphonotida rostrata is a species of beetle in the family Cerambycidae, the only species in the genus Cyphonotida.

References

Lepturinae